Oriental Education Society was established in the year 1992 by Javed Khan as a Public Charitable Trust providing higher education in the Mumbai and Navi Mumbai  region. It has 13 Institutes located on 4 campuses, which now have over 8000 students in all.

The colleges  are all recognized by various bodies of Govt. of India like the A. I. C. T. E., The Pharmacy council of India, National Council for Teachers Education; the degree courses are affiliated to the University of Mumbai.

Institutions run by the Oriental Education Society
Oriental Institute of Management, Vashi, Navi Mumbai
Oriental School of Business, Vashi, Navi Mumbai
OES International School, Vashi, Navi Mumbai
OES International School, Andheri, Mumbai
H K Institute of Management and Research, Oshiwara, Mumbai
H K College of Pharmacy, Oshiwara, Mumbai
H K College of Education, Oshiwara,
Oriental College of Pharmacy, in Sanpada, Navi Mumbai
Sanpada College of Commerce and Technology, Sanpada, Navi Mumbai
Oriental College of Education. in Sanpada, Navi Mumbai
Sanpada College of Commerce and Technology (Junior College), Sanpada, Navi Mumbai
Oriental College of Commerce and Management, Andheri, Mumbai
Oriental College of Education and Research, Andheri, Mumbai
Oriental College of Commerce and Management (Junior College), Andheri, Mumbai

References

External links 
 Official website (Oriental Education Society) | www.oes.edu.in
 Oriental Institute of Management | www.oim.edu.in
 OES International School | www.oesis.edu.in
 Sanpada College of Commerce and Technology | www.scct.edu.in
 Oriental college of Pharmacy | www.ocp.edu.in
 Oriental College of Commerce and Management | www.occm.edu.in

Educational organisations in Maharashtra
1992 establishments in Maharashtra
Organisations based in Mumbai
Organizations established in 1992